Wilmo Francioni (born 8 November 1948) is a retired Italian professional road cyclist. He rode the Tour de France in 1971 and Giro d'Italia in 1970–1972 and 1974–1977, winning four stages in total (in 1972 and 1977).

References 

1948 births
Living people
Italian male cyclists
People from Empoli
Sportspeople from the Metropolitan City of Florence
Cyclists from Tuscany